Rossmore is a suburb of Poole, Dorset. Rossmore is close to Alder Hills, Newtown and Parkstone.

Amenities 
The area is served by the Rossmore Leisure Centre and Rossmore Library.

Politics 
Rossmore is split between the Poole and the Bournemouth West parliamentary constituencies. Southern Rossmore is also part of the Newtown and Heatherlands ward which elects 3 councillors to Bournemouth, Christchurch and Poole Council, and Northern Rossmore is part of the Alderney and Bourne Valley ward.

References

External links 

 Rossmore bus

Areas of Poole